Events in the year 2009 in Ukraine.

Incumbents 

 President: Viktor Yushchenko
 Prime Minister: Yulia Tymoshenko

Events 

 14 June – The final of the Junior Eurovision Song Contest 2009, attended by Prime Minister Yulia Tymoshenko, took place at the International Children's Centre 'Artek' in Kyiv, and was hosted by commentator for Eurovision and Junior Eurovision Timur Miroshnychenko and three-time participant at the Ukrainian Junior national final Marietta.

Deaths 
 Iryna Senyk, poet, nurse and political dissident (25 October)

References 

 
Ukraine
Ukraine
2000s in Ukraine
Years of the 21st century in Ukraine